Sir John Oscar Moreton  (28 December 1917 – 14 October 2012) was a British diplomat.

Early life
Moreton born in Oakham, Rutland, and was educated at St Edward's School, Oxford and Trinity College, Oxford. He served in the Royal Artillery during the Second World War, and was awarded the Military Cross in 1944, following the Battle of Kohima.

Diplomatic career
Moreton joined the Diplomatic Service in 1946. After postings to Kenya (1953–55) and Nigeria (1961–64), he served as Ambassador of the United Kingdom to Vietnam from 1969 to 1971. He was then the High Commissioner to Malta from 1972 to 1974, and between 1975 and 1977, served in the United States, first as Deputy Permanent Representative in the UK Mission to the United Nations in New York, and then as Minister in Washington, the deputy to the Ambassador.

He was appointed CMG in 1966 and KCMG in 1978, and KCVO in 1976.

Following his retirement, Moreton served as Gentleman Usher of the Blue Rod from 19 October 1979 – 24 July 1992.

References

External links
Archives of Sir John Moreton at the University of London

1917 births
2012 deaths
People from Oakham
People educated at St Edward's School, Oxford
Alumni of Trinity College, Oxford
British Army personnel of World War II
Royal Artillery officers
Recipients of the Military Cross
Ambassadors of the United Kingdom to Vietnam
High Commissioners of the United Kingdom to Malta
Knights Commander of the Order of St Michael and St George
Knights Commander of the Royal Victorian Order
British expatriates in Kenya
British expatriates in Nigeria
British expatriates in the United States